Kesi was the Ganadhara of twenty third Jain Tirthankara, Parshvanatha, who is said to have met Gautama.

Notes

References
 

Ganadhara
Indian Jain monks
7th-century BC Indian Jains
7th-century BC Jain monks
7th-century BC Indian monks